Trestoncideres is a genus of longhorn beetles of the subfamily Lamiinae, containing the following species:

 Trestoncideres albiventris Martins & Galileo, 2005
 Trestoncideres laterialba Martins & Galileo, 1990
 Trestoncideres santossilvai Nearns & Tavakilian, 2012

References

Onciderini